The 2005 Mid-Continent Conference men's basketball tournament took place between Saturday, March 5, 2006 and Tuesday, March 8, 2006 at the John Q. Hammons Arena in Tulsa, Oklahoma.

Bracket

Championship game
On March 8, Oakland clinched their first-ever bid to the NCAA tournament – it was their eighth year in Division I – by dispatching league favorite Oral Roberts in their conference tournament final. The final score was 61–60. Pierre Dukes was the hero, hitting a 3-pointer with 1.3 seconds left. It was his only shot of the second half. Afterwards, Ken Tutt's desperation shot at the buzzer banked high off the rim and Oakland celebrated. After the game, Dukes said, "When I got it, I looked at the clock and there wasn't enough time to get it back to him, so I figured I'd let it fly." He was referring to Rawle Marshall who passed it to him for the winning shot. Dukes was shooting 35 percent from 3-point range and almost didn't even make the team.

Cortney Scott had 19 points for Oakland, while Marshall scored 18. Caleb Green had 13 points for the Oral Roberts Golden Eagles in the loss, while Tutt added 12. While the Golden Eagles did lead at half time, 28–27, the Golden Grizzlies went on a 17–6 run to begin the second half, and Oral Roberts had to claw their way back to have the lead in the closing seconds.

The Golden Grizzlies started the season with seven consecutive losses and had the fourth-hardest non-conference strength of schedule at the end of the season. At 12–18, they had the worst record of any qualifier to the NCAA tournament. They won the play-in game against Alabama A&M, then lost to North Carolina in the first round.

See also
 The Summit League men's basketball tournament

References

2004–05 Mid-Continent Conference men's basketball season
Summit League men's basketball tournament
Basketball competitions in Tulsa, Oklahoma
2005 in sports in Oklahoma